"Shoot" is the ninth episode of the first season of the American television drama series Mad Men. It was written by Chris Provenzano and series creator Matthew Weiner and was directed by Paul Feig. The episode originally aired on the AMC channel in the United States on September 13, 2007.

Plot
During the intermission of the Broadway show Fiorello!, Don and Betty run into Jim Hobart, the head of rival ad agency McCann Erickson. Jim makes Don a job offer and gives his business card to Betty, telling her that she would be a perfect model for their Coca-Cola campaign. Betty is excited, thinking back to her days as a model before she married, but Don is ambivalent to the idea. When he gets home, he sees that Betty has prepared an elaborate meal, and is concerned  that she won't be home to prepare such meals if she is working. She reassures him that she will still do so, and that her friend Ethel will watch the kids and he eventually relents. Throughout the episode, Jim continues his headhunt of Don, but he remains evasive. Betty greatly enjoys her work, but while there, Sally's dog Polly attacks a neighbor's pet pigeon and he threatens shoot the dog if it happens again.

Meanwhile, Pete and Harry discuss how to assist with Richard Nixon's presidential campaign. Pete comes up with the idea to buy up ad space in swing states for client Secor Laxatives, thus preventing Nixon's rival John F. Kennedy from running competing ads. The strategy pays off, and Bert and Roger praise the idea. Peggy, struggling with her recent weight gain, accidentally rips her skirt. Joan offers her a new outfit, an ill-fitting dress. When Peggy returns the dress, Joan tries to give her advice about losing weight. Peggy tells her that she is more interested in being a writer than attracting men, which confuses Joan, who thought Peggy was only feigning interest in writing to get closer to Paul. Ken makes a rude comment about Peggy's weight, leading Pete to sucker punch him, causing a fight which is broken up by Paul who has Pete and Ken shake hands and make up.

Betty and Don find out about their neighbor's threat when Sally has a nightmare. Don is angry, but Betty convinces him not to confront their neighbor. Meanwhile, Roger notices that Don is being wooed by McCann. Don is non-committal about what he is going to do, but when photos of Betty's shoot arrive, he immediately walks into Roger's office to tell him he is turning down the job. He negotiates a better salary and promises that if he were to ever leave, it wouldn't be for another advertising job. This also ends Betty's aspirations to be a model, and she fails to hold back tears at her disappointment.

When Don comes home that night, Betty does not tell Don that she was let go, saying instead that she didn't like the idea of not being home enough to make him elaborate meals, and she was scared of Manhattan. Don says he doesn't care about his meals, only that she's a great mom to their kids, calling her an angel. Betty smiles as she agrees that that is what is most important, not giving any sign of her true feelings. The next day, Betty walks into the front yard with a lit cigarette and Bobby's BB gun and begins shooting at her neighbor's pigeons as they fly overhead.

Reception
The episode was received positively by critics. Alan Sepinwall, writing for New Jersey's The Star-Ledger, praised the episode, singling out Betty's story, the ending of which he described as "scary, tragic, funny, and kinda hot, all in one." Andrew Johnston, writing for Slant Magazine, called the episode "a relative disappointment" following "The Hobo Code," but still praised the complexity of the episode's story.

References

External links
"Shoot" at AMC

Mad Men (season 1) episodes
2007 American television episodes
Television episodes directed by Paul Feig